The Halgaito Formation is the basal Permian geologic member of the Cutler Group in southern Utah. The member consists of silty sandstone, siltstone and limestone. The Elephant Canyon may grade into the Halgaito and grades northward into the Cedar Mesa Formation.

Extent 
There is no designated type locality for the Halgaito. The shale can be seen at the confluence of the Green River and Colorado Rivers and in Cataract Canyon.

References

Geologic formations of Utah
Permian geology of Utah
Permian System of North America
Cutler Formation